Bruskespar is a genus of beetles in the family Carabidae, containing the following species:

 Bruskespar deuvei Morvan, 1998
 Bruskespar kevnidennek Morvan, 1998

References

Platyninae